Yan Zi and Zheng Jie were the defending champions, but neither chose to compete that year.

Vania King and Sania Mirza won the title 6–1, 6–2 over Andreea Ehritt-Vanc and Anastasia Rodionova in the final.

Seeds

  Vania King /  Sania Mirza (champions) 
  Andreea Ehritt-Vanc /  Anastasia Rodionova (finals)
  Jill Craybas /  Jarmila Gajdošová (first round)
  Ji Chunmei /  Sun Shengnan (first round)

Results

Draw

References
 Results

2007 WTA Tour
Morocco Open
2007 in Moroccan tennis